Shohal Mazullah Khan is a village and union council (an administrative subdivision) of Mansehra District in the Khyber-Pakhtunkhwa province of Pakistan. It is located at the bank of River Kuhnar, in the east of the District Mansehra, about 7 km to Balakot and it borders Muzaffarabad District and lies in an area affected by the 2005 Kashmir earthquake.

The village was badly hit by the 2005 earthquake and was also destroyed in 1992 and 2010 by flood.

Population of area is generally educated and there are separate high schools for boys and girls, there are many personalities who are serving the country through different ways some of them are Dr. Zia Ur Rehamn, Dr. Major Atta Ur Rehman, Sheraz Ahmed - CA, Col (R) Riaz Ahmed (Late), Waqas Sadiq (Estate Adviser in RWP/ISLD), Ehsanullah Khan, Babar Khan, and many more. There are several Middle and Primary Schools located in this village including Govt Boys High School and Govt Girls High School. Whereas Govt Boys Degree College of Balakot is situated at the distance of 5 km, Govt College of Commerce Kot-Bhalla is located about 3 km distance and Govt Girls College is about 4 km distance from this village.

References

Union councils of Mansehra District
Populated places in Mansehra District